Boniecki  (with its female form Boniecka  and plural form Bonieccy ) is a Polish surname which is most frequent in the central voivodeships of Kuyavia-Pomerania and Masovia and can also be found among the Polish diaspora. It may have been derived from the Polish version Bonifacy of the given name Boniface.

Notable people with the name Boniecki/Boniecka include:

 Jerzy Boniecki (born 1933), Polish former swimmer
 Maria Boniecka (1910–1978), Polish author and teacher
 Maria Albin Boniecki (1908–1995), Polish artist

References

Polish-language surnames